The 1924 Swedish Ice Hockey Championship was the third season of the Swedish Ice Hockey Championship, the national championship of Sweden. IK Gota won the championship.

Tournament

External links
 Season on hockeyarchives.info

Champ
Swedish Ice Hockey Championship seasons